Bren Smith is an aquaculture professional and former commercial fisherman, best known for pioneering Regenerative Ocean Farming via co-founding the non-profit GreenWave.

Born in Maddox Cove, Newfoundland, Canada, Smith left school aged 14 to become a commercial fisherman, plying his trade in the Grand Banks and the Bering Sea. Having left the commercial fishing and subsequently the fish farming industries, he founded the Thimble Island Ocean Farm, on the Thimbles Islands in Long Island Sound, before co-founding GreenWave to promote the co-existent aquaculture of kelp and shellfish by local communities.

Smith gave one of the two 35th Annual E.F. Schumacher Lectures, organised by the Schumacher Center for a New Economics, entitled Ecological Redemption: Ocean Farming in the Era of Climate Change.

Smith graduated from Cornell Law School.

Awards
In 2015, Smith won the Buckminster Fuller Challenge prize for the GreenWave design. In 2017, he was named by Rolling Stone as one of its 25 People Shaping the Future. Also in 2017, the GreenWave 3D Farm was named one of Time's 25 Best Inventions of 2017. In 2019, his semi-autobiographical work Eat Like A Fish, published by Penguin Random House, won a James Beard Foundation Book Award.

Books
Eat Like A Fish - My adventures as a fisherman turned restorative ocean farmer, 2019, Vintage Books

References 

Living people
Year of birth missing (living people)
Canadian agriculturalists
Canadian fishers
People from Newfoundland (island)